Haselsdorf-Tobelbad is a municipality in the district of Graz-Umgebung in the Austrian state of Styria. It was the birthplace of Erik von Kuehnelt-Leddihn.

Geography
Haselsdorf-Tobelbad lies about 10 km southwest of Graz in western Styria.

References

Cities and towns in Graz-Umgebung District